Byeon Sang-su (born September 8, 1964) is a South Korean sprint canoer who competed in the late 1980s. At the 1988 Summer Olympics in Seoul, he was eliminated in the repechages of the K-2 500 m event.

References

1964 births
Canoeists at the 1988 Summer Olympics
Living people
Olympic canoeists of South Korea
South Korean male canoeists